Radiša (Cyrillic script: Радиша) is a masculine given name of Slavic origin. It may refer to:

 Radiša Čubrić (born 1962), Serbian former cyclist
 Radiša Ilić (born 1977), Serbian former football goalkeeper

See also
Radišići

Slavic masculine given names
Serbian masculine given names